The index of physics articles is split into multiple pages due to its size.

To navigate by individual letter use the table of contents below.

V

V. Balakrishnan (physicist)
V838 Monocerotis
VELO
VEPP-2000
VINITI Database RAS
VIRGOHI21
VNIR
VORPAL
V band
V particle
Vacancy defect
Vacuum
Vacuum Rabi oscillation
Vacuum airship
Vacuum arc
Vacuum catastrophe
Vacuum coffee maker
Vacuum deposition
Vacuum energy
Vacuum expectation value
Vacuum flask
Vacuum genesis
Vacuum induction melting
Vacuum level
Vacuum manifold
Vacuum metallizing
Vacuum permeability
Vacuum permittivity
Vacuum polarization
Vacuum solution
Vacuum solution (general relativity)
Vacuum state
Vadim Knizhnik
Vafa–Witten theorem
Vagn Walfrid Ekman
Val Logsdon Fitch
Valence band
Valence electron
Valentin Ceaușescu
Valentin Danilov
Valentin Panteleimonovich Smirnov
Valentin Scheidel
Valentine Bargmann
Valentine Telegdi
Valery Chalidze
Valery Pokrovsky
Van Allen radiation belt
Van Hove singularity
Van Stockum dust
Van Zandt Williams
Van de Graaff generator
Van der Waals equation
Van der Waerden notation
Vandana Shiva
Vaneless ion wind generator
Vapor-compression refrigeration
Vapor pressure
Vapor quality
Vaporization
Vapour-pressure deficit
Vapour density
Variable-mass system
Variable-sweep wing
Variable Density Tunnel
Variable mass hypothesis
Variable speed of light
Variables and some constants commonly used in physics
Variational method
Variational methods in general relativity
Variational perturbation theory
Variational principle
Varifocal lens
Vasco Ronchi
Vasilii Sergeevich Vladimirov
Vasily Vladimirovich Petrov
Vassili Nesterenko
Vassilis Angelopoulos
Vassilis Papazachos
Vector (mathematics and physics)
Vector boson
Vector decomposition
Vector meson
Vector meson dominance
Vector potential
Vegard's law
Velocimetry
Velocity
Velocity-addition formula
Velocity overshoot
Velocity potential
Velo–Zwanziger problem
Vena contracta
Venedikt Dzhelepov
Veniamin Levich
Ventilation (architecture)
Venturi effect
Venturi flume
Vera Yurasova
Verdet constant
Vergence (optics)
Vern Oliver Knudsen
Vernon Ellis Cosslett
Versatile Toroidal Facility
Vertex distance
Vertex function
Vertex model
Vertex operator algebra
Vertical-cavity surface-emitting laser
Vertical-external-cavity surface-emitting-laser
Vertical deflection
Vertical penetration
Vertical wind tunnel
Vertico SMI
Very-long-baseline interferometry
Very Large Array
Very Large Hadron Collider
Very Small Array
Very high frequency
Very large floating structure
Very low frequency
Very special relativity
Via Panisperna boys
Vibrating sample magnetometer
Vibrating string
Vibrating structure gyroscope
Vibration
Vibration galvanometer
Vibration isolation
Vibrational analysis with scanning probe microscopy
Vibrational energy relaxation
Vibrational partition function
Vibrational transition
Vibronic coupling
Vickers hardness test
Victor Albert Bailey
Victor Balykin
Victor Emery
Victor Francis Hess
Victor Frederick Weisskopf
Victor Ninov
Victor Pavlovich Maslov
Victor Popov
Victor Schumann
Victor Vacquier
Victor Veselago
Vienna Ab initio Simulation Package
Vienna Standard Mean Ocean Water
Vienna rectifier
View factor
Vijay Raghunath Pandharipande
Viking Olver Eriksen
Vikram Sarabhai
Viktor Dilman
Viktor Hambardzumyan
Viktor Safronov
Viktor Trkal
Vilhelm Bjerknes
Vilho Väisälä
Villari effect
Vincenc Strouhal
Vincent Courtillot
Vincent Kavečanský
Vincenzo Viviani
Vinko Dvořák
Vinča Nuclear Institute
Virasoro algebra
Virgo interferometer
Virial coefficient
Virial expansion
Virial stress
Virial theorem
Virtual black hole
Virtual image
Virtual particle
Virtual state
Virtual work
Vis-viva equation
Vis viva
Viscimetry
Viscoelasticity
Viscometer
Viscosity
Viscosity of amorphous materials
Viscous fingering
Viscous remanent magnetization
Viscous stress tensor
Visible-light photon counter
Visible spectrum
Visible-spectrum telescope
Vitaly Efimov
Vitaly Ginzburg
Vito Volterra
Vitrification
Vittorio Prodi
Vladimir A. Babeshko
Vladimir Alexandrov
Vladimir Belousov
Vladimir Damgov
Vladimir E. Zakharov
Vladimir Fock
Vladimir Gribov
Vladimir Hütt
Vladimir Ignatowski
Vladimir Jurko Glaser
Vladimir Keilis-Borok
Vladimir Korepin
Vladimir Krivchenkov
Vladimir M. Shalaev
Vladimir Paar
Vladimir Rojansky
Vladimir Shalaev
Vladimir Steklov
Vladimir Teplyakov
Vladimir Varićak
Vladimir Veksler
Vlasov equation
Vlatko Vedral
Voigt effect
Volatility (chemistry)
Volker Heine
Volodymyr Semynozhenko
Volt
Volta Prize
Volta potential
Voltage
Volume (thermodynamics)
Volume fraction
Volume of fluid method
Volume viscosity
Volumetric flow rate
Volumetric flux
Volumetric heat capacity
Volute (pump)
von Karman Institute for Fluid Dynamics
Von Kármán constant
Von Neumann entropy
Vortex
Vortex-induced vibration
Vortex (software)
Vortex core line
Vortex dynamics
Vortex generator
Vortex lattice method
Vortex lift
Vortex ring
Vortex ring state
Vortex ring toy
Vortex shedding
Vortex sheet
Vortex state
Vortex stretching
Vortical
Vorticity
Vorticity confinement
Vorticity equation
Vorton
Vsevolod Frederiks
Vulcan laser

Indexes of physics articles